This is a list of producers, writers and directors for the BBC soap opera EastEnders.

Current production team

Producers

Executive producers

 Julia Smith (1985–1989)
 Mike Gibbon (1989-1990)
 Michael Ferguson (1990–1991)
 Pat Sandys (1991)
 Leonard Lewis (1991–1994)
 Helen Greaves (1991–1992)
 Barbara Emile (1994–1995)
 Corinne Hollingworth (1995–1997)
 Jane Harris (1997–1998)
 Mike Hudson (1998)
 Matthew Robinson (1998–2000)
 John Yorke (2000–2002)
 Louise Berridge (2002–2004)
 Kathleen Hutchison (2004–2005)
 John Yorke (2005, acting)
 Kate Harwood (2005–2007)
 Diederick Santer (2007–2010)
 Bryan Kirkwood (2010–2012)
 Lorraine Newman (2012–2013)
 Dominic Treadwell-Collins (2013–2016)
 Sean O'Connor (2016–2017)
 Jon Sen (2019–2022)
 Chris Clenshaw (2022–present)

Executive consultants
 John Yorke (2017–2019)

Senior producers
 Nicky Cotton
 Sharon Batten
 Liza Mellody

Associate producers

 Simon Bird (2006–2008)
 Diana Brookes (unknown)
 Michael Darbon (2004–2005)
 Corinne Hollingworth (1986–1989)
 Nick Jones (2000)
 Rona McKendrick (2003)
 Sue Smith (2001–2004)
 Nigel Taylor (2000–2001)
 Nick Orchard (1985–86)
 Lesley Longfellow (1995-1998)

Line producers
 Susan Mather (2008–2021)
 Derek Donohoe (2017)
 Dee Hellier (2017, 2021-present)

Studio producers
 Liza Mellody (2018-2019)

Series producers

 Julia Smith (1985–1988)
 Mike Gibbon (1989-1991)
 Leonard Lewis (1991-1994)
 Barbara Emile (1994-1995)
 Jane Harris (1995–1997)
 Mike Hudson (1997-1999)
 John Yorke (1999-2000)
 Lorraine Newman (2000-2002)
 Louise Berridge (2002)
 Belinda Campbell (2003)
 Helena Pope (2003-2004)
 Peter Rose (2004)
 Sharon Hughff (2004–2005)
 Lorraine Newman (2005-2012)
 Jenny Robins (2012)
 Sharon Batten (2012–2013)
 Ceri Meyrick (2013)
 Alison Davis (2013–2014)
 Sharon Batten (2015–present)

Series story producers

Huw Kennair-Jones (2004–2005)
Brigie de Courcy (2006–2007)
Dominic Treadwell-Collins (2007–2010)
Emily Gascoyne (2010–2011)
Kathleen Beedles (2011–2012)
Deborah Sathe (2012–2013)
Sarah Beeson (2013)
Alexander Lamb (2013–2016)
Liza Mellody (2017–2018)
Chris Clenshaw (2018–2019)
Ciaràn Hayden (2018)
Nasreen Ahmed (2019)
Poz Watson (2019–2021)
Kyri Zindlis (2021)
Erin Kubicki (2021)
Ian Warren (2021-2022)
Rory Nugent (2022-)

Script producers

 Lorraine Newman (2000-2001) 
 Liza Mellody (2004)
 Tom Mullens (2005-2006)
 Vicki Delow (2006-2007)
 Sharon Batten (2007-2013)
 Manpreet Dosanjh (2013-2015)
 Ross Murray (2015)
 Nicole Fitzpatrick (2016-2017) 
 Kris Green (2017-2021; 2022-)
 Claire Burgess (2021-2022)

Directors

Neil Alderton (2016–2017)
Romey Allison (1986–1987)
Jeremy Ancock (1985, 1988)
David Andrews (1991)
Jamie Annett (1998–2012, 2018–)
Paul Annett (1998–2002, 2005–2009)
Sallie Aprahamian (1995–1996, 2014)
Douglas Argent (1991)
Clive Arnold (2000–2001, 2003–2013, 2019)
Sven Arnstein (2006)
Jane Ashmore (2016–2019)
Sheila Atha (1990)
Albert Barber (1996–1997)
Ian Barber (2013)
Mike Barnes (1990)
Edward Bazalgette (2007)
Adrian Bean (1994–1998)
Charles Beeson (1990–1992)
Paul Bernard (1990)
Indra Bhose (1992–1993, 1996, 2019, 2021–)
Antonia Bird (1985–1986)
Darrol Blake (1989–1990)
Gerald Blake (1989)
Keith Boak (1993–1994)
Peter Boisseau (1989)
Jeff Lincoln Boulter (unknown)
Dermot Boyd (1995, 1997)
Ed Braman (1996)
Will Brenton (2019)
Michael E. Briant (1995)
Emma Bridgeman-Williams (1999–2002)
Bill Britten (1996)
Jeremy Brock (1995)
Ian Brown (1999)
John Bruce (1991–1992)
Michael Buffong (2002–2003, 2009–2010)
Stephen Butcher (1985, 1991, 2001)
Sue Butterworth (1985–1986, 1994–1995, 2001–2005)
Sue Bysh (1994–1995)
Helen Caldwell (1999)
Topher Campbell (2007)
Philip Casson (1990–2005, 2008)
Justin Chadwick (1999–2000)
Lisa Clarke (2003, 2006)
S. J. Clarkson (2004)
Chris Clough (1985–1988)
Nicholas (Nick) Cohen (2007)
Audrey Cooke (1995, 2009–2010, 2014, 2017, 2020)
Frank Cox (1988)
Vivienne Cozens (1985)
Ron Craddock (1986)
David Crozier (1990)
Mervyn Cumming (1987–1991)
Richard Dale (1999–2000)
Jennie Darnell (2007–2018)
John Darnell (1994)
Ella Davis (unknown)
Angela (Angie) de Chastelai Smith (1999–2000, 2002–2003)
Jonathan Dent (1995–1997)
Edward Dick (2020)
Mike Dormer (1991–1992)
Nigel Douglas (1995–1996, 2001–2003)
John Dower (2003–2006, 2016–2019)
Philip Draycott (1988–1990, 1998)
Haldane Duncan (1997–1998)
Sue Dunderdale (1991–1995, 1999, 2001, 2005)
Terry Dyddgen-Jones (2010–2011)
Jon East (1996–1997, 2000–2001)
Christiana Ebohon (2002–003)
David Innes Edwards (1991–1992, 1994)
Julie Edwards (1998–2000)
Peter Edwards (1985, 1988)
Stewart Edwards (2000–2001)
James Erskine (2002)
Sarah Esdaile (2019–)
Matthew Evans (1989–1990, 1992, 2019–)
Rob Evans (1994–1995, 1997, 1999)
Brett Fallis (1997–2004)
Chris Fallon (1994–1996, 2008)
Geoff Feld (1991–1998, 2000–2002)
Michael Ferguson (1990)
Steve Finn (1995, 2002–2004, 2006–2012, 2014–2018)
Maggie Ford (1993)
Henry Foster (1987, 1996)
Toby Frow (2014–)
Robert Gabriel (1985–1986, 1989, 1998–2000)
Anthony Garrick (1998)
Roger Gartland (1992–1993)
Stephen Garwood (1993–1994, 1998, 2018)
Rebecca Gatward (2010, 2013–2016)
Martin Gent (unknown)
Mike Gibbon (1985–989)
Elizabeth (Liz) Gill (2010)
Bill Gilmour (1994–1996)
Kenneth (Kenny) Glenaan (1998, 2020)
Jim Goddard (1999)
Steve Goldie (1987–1989, 1995–1996, 2002, 2005)
John Gorrie (1996)
John Greening (1996, 2002–)
Alister Hallum (1990)
Graeme Harper (2000, 2002)
Geoff Harris (2002)
Paul Harrison (1990)
Graeme Hattrick (2001–2005)
Andy Hay (2000–2002)
Bill Hays (1991–1994)
Sean Healy (2018–2019, 2021–)
Thomas Hescott (2016–2017, 2019)
Nicky Higgens (2011–2012)
Christopher Hodson (1990)
Julian Holmes (1997–1998, 2000)
Matt Holt (2020)
Richard Holthouse (1991)
Tom Hooper (1989–2000)
John Howlett (2012–)
Menhaj Huda (2000)
Terry Iland (1989, 1991–1992)
Waris Islam (2016–2019)
Caroline Jeffries (2006)
Marc Jobst (2002)
Jo Johnson (1994–1995, 2003–2004, 2008)
Mickey Jones (2011–2012, 2014–2016, 2019–2020)
Nick Jones (1999)
Francesca Joseph (2000, 2010)
Chris Jury (2000–2004)
Alex Kalymnios (2010–2013)
Dominic Keavey (2005, 2013–2018, 2020)
Michael Keillor (2007–2010)
Karen Kelly (2003)
James Kent (2000)
Oliver Kent (2003)
Michael Kerrigan (1990)
David Kester (2003–2005, 2019–)
Ray Kilby (1997–1998)
Clare Kilner (1997–1998)
Tom Kingdon (1987–1988, 1996–1997)
Margy Kinmonth (1992–1993)
Lance Kneeshaw (2010–)
Christine Lalla (2021–)
Philippa Langdale (1997–1998)
James Larkin (2018–2019)
Richard Laxton (1993)
Tim Leandro (1997–1999, 2003–2004)
Barry Letts (1990–1992)
Leonard Lewis (1990–1994)
Sophie Lifschutz (2013–2017)
Nickie Lister (2020)
Mike Lloyd (1986)
Christopher (Chris) Lovett (1987–1989)
Richard Lynn (2012–2019)
Stuart MacDonald (1988)
Jonathan Marks (2003)
David Mason (1996)
Simon Massey (2019–)
Dez McCarthy (1997–1999)
Christopher (Chris) McGill (2019–)
Tony McHale (1992–1994)
Tim Mercier (2000–2003, 2005–2014)
Simon Meyers (1992)
Chris Miller (1994–1995, 1997, 1999–2000)
Peter Moffatt (1986)
David Moor (2013–2019, 2021–)
Stephen Moore (1996–1997)
Reza Moradi (2014–2015)
Andrew Morgan (1993–1994)
Brian Morgan (1985)
Michael Owen Morris (2003–2019)
Conor Morrissey (2018–)
Jeff Naylor (1994–1996, 2005)
Karl Neilson (2001–2007, 2009–2019)
Afia Nkrumah (2016–2018)
Sean O'Connor (2002)
Deborah Paige (2002)
Kay Patrick (1986)
Joy Perino (1996)
Nic Phillips (2006, 2009, 2011–2016)
Richard (Rick) Platt (2000–2002, 2004–2012, 2016–2017, 2019)
Nicholas Prosser (1986–1992, 2002–2005)
Hannah Quinn (2019)
Sarah Punshon (2007, 2009)
Jeremy Raison (2004)
Nimer Rashed (2020)
Nick Read (1997)
Beryl Richards (1992–1993)
Chris Richards (2005–2007)
David Richardson (1995–1998)
Matthew Robinson (1985–1987)
Vito Rocco (2017)
Peter Rose (2003–2010)
Anne Ross Muir (2002)
Gwennan Sage (1993–1995, 2009–2013)
Lee Salisbury (2010–2012, 2014, 2016)
Michael Samuels (1999, 2001)
Dominic Santana (2002)
Kate Saxon (2014, 2016–2018)
Mark Sendell (2000–2008)
Penelope Shales-Slyne (1994, 1996–1998, 2006, 2016–2018, 2020)
Jim Shields (1998–1999)
Steve Shill (1995–1998)
Pip Short (1995–1996, 1998)
Jeremy Silberston (1988–1989)
Bren Simson (1986, 1993)
William (Will) Sinclair (2006–2007)
William Slater (1985–1989)
Jerry Smith (2011)
Julia Smith (1985–1989)
Jean Stewart (1991)
Brian Stirner (1993–1994)
Karen Stowe (1995–1996)
Rupert Such (2006, 2008–2010, 2012–2014)
Piotr Szkopiak (2012–2014)
Malcolm Taylor (1985)
Alice Troughton (2004–2006)
David Tucker (2008–2011, 2014–2019)
Garth Tucker (1986–1989, 1992–1995)
Susan Tully (1998–1999)
Paul Unwin (1992–1993)
Tony Virgo (1986–1988)
Dearbhla Walsh (2002)
Alan Wareing (1986, 1990)
Laura Way (2018–2019)
Bruce Webb (2019)
Ian White (1993, 2012–2018)
Gill Wilkinson (2014–2015)
Misha Williams (1994–1995)
Daniel Wilson (2000, 2011–2014, 2019)
Laurence Wilson (2006–2010, 2016–)
Ronald Wilson (1992)
Claire Winyard (1996–1997, 2014)
Jeremy Woolf (1993–1994)
Colin Wratten (2001–2003)
Jonathan Wright-Miller (1991–1993)
Paul Wroblewski (1997, 2005–2006)
Ali Yassine (2003)
Johnathan Young (1995–1996)

Writers

Sally Abbott (2009–2013)
Juliet Ace (1985–1990)
Dare Aiyegbayo (2007–2009, 2014–2017)
Abby Ajayi (2008)
Robin Allen (1987)
Ross Anderson (2003)
Carey Andrews (2000–)
Chris Anstis (1985)
Simon Ashdown (1995–2013, 2017–) 
Simon J Ashford (2000–2003)
Al Hunter Ashton (1986, 1999–2002, 2006)
David Ashton (1985–1986, 1988)
Liane Aukin (1985–1990, 1996)
Fraser Ayres (2021)
Samina Baig (2008–2009)
Perrie Balthazar (2010–2013)
Jessica Barnes (2021–)
John Barrington  (1986)
Matthew Barry (2011–2015, 2017–2018)
Tony Basgallop (1996–2002)
Peter Batt (1985–1986)
Katie Baxendale (1999)
Michael Begley (2010–2013, 2019–2020)
Sonali Bhattacharyya (2009)
Gupreet Bhatti (2001–2004)
Tom Bidwell (2010)
Tony Bilbow (1986)
Lucy Blincoe (2002–2006)
Helen Blizard (1994–1997, 2000–2004)
Chris Boiling (2006)
Roy Boulter (2011–2012)
Gavin James Bower (2014–2016) 
Abi Bown (2007–2008)
Sandy Boyce (2004)
Susan Boyd (1985–1998, 2000–2004)
Carrie-Anne Brackstone (2009)
Gil Brailey (unknown)
Colin Brake (1992–1995)
John Brennan (2000)
Doug Briggs (1998–2000)
Martin Brocklebank (2010)
Ray Brooking (2009)
Edel Brosnan (2000)
Matthew Broughton (2011)
Gary Brown (2000–2003, 2005)
David Joss Buckley (1995–1997, 2002–2004, 2014)
Andrew Burrell (2022)
Robert Butler (2016–2018)
Paul Campbell (2008–2010, 2014)
Johnny Candon (2018–2020)
Guido Casale (1986)
Steve Casey (2021–)
Brendan J. Cassin (1990–1992)
Mark Catley (2006–2007, 2011–2012, 2017–2019)
Maureen Chadwick (1987)
John Chambers (1992)
Tom Chaplin (2007)
Scott Cherry (1995)
Gaby Chiappe (2002–2005)
Nazrin Choudhury (2003–2004)
Jaden Clark (2004–2010, 2014–2018)
Angela Clarke (2007)
Madeleine Clifford (1995, 2017–)
Mark Clompus (1999–2009)
Phil Clymer (2017–2018)
Paul Coates (2004–2005)
Nathan Cockerill (2008–2009)
Lin Coghlan (2002–2005)
Bridget Colgan (2003–2010)
Len Collin (1994–1997, 1999, 2002)
Andrew Collins (2000–2002)
Deborah Cook (1990–1994, 1997, 1999–2006)
Trish Cooke (1991)
Shirley Cooklin (1987) 
Ben Cooper (1998–1999)
Matthew Cooper (2003)
Gemma Copping (2020–)
Angela Corner (2009–2010)
Andrew Cornish (2006)
Daisy Coulam (2007, 2009, 2011–2014)
Julia Cranney (2021)
John Crisp (1985, 1989)
Nick Crittenden (1996–1997)
Graeme Curry (1989)
Gina Dallow (2013)
Lynne Dallow (1996–1998, 2000–2002, 2004, 2006, 2014–)
Sarah Daniels (1987, 1989–1990, 2003)
Jonathan David (1995)
Richard Davidson (2004–2010, 2014–2017, 2019–)
Lesley Davies (1991)
Mark Davies Markham (1995–1996, 2000)
Jamie Davis (2022–)
Jenny Davis (2021)
Linda Dearsley (1990–1991)
Oliver Dennis (1999–2001)
Tony Dennis (1985)
Emma Dennis-Edwards (2021)
John Derrek (unknown)
Emilia di Girolamo (2008–2010)
Ann Marie Di Mambro (2002–2007, 2011)
Raymond Dixon (1996)
Paul Dodgson (2000–2001)
Katie Douglas (2012–2017, 2020–)
Paul Doust (1989–1990)
Bev Doyle (1985–1986)
John Drew (1988)
Harry Duffin (1985)
Shaun Duggan (2003–2006)
Polly Eden (2005–2007)
Sean Egan (1990–1991)
Michael Ellis (1990–1991)
Kenny Emson (2012, 2018)
Tony Etchells (1993–1995, 2001–2005)
Fiona Evans (2008–2010)
Lisa Evans (1991–1993, 1996–2000)
Matthew (Matt) Evans (2007–2017)
Robert Evans (2018)
Dana Fainaru (2006–2007, 2014, 2016, 2019–2020)
Lilie Ferrari (1992–1993, 1997, 1999, 2001)
Chris Fewtrell (1996)
Alison Fisher (1995–1996, 2000–2010, 2016)
Nick Fisher (2014)
Shannon Fitzgerald (unknown)
Rachel Flowerday (2007–2010, 2015)
Anthony Forbes (1992)
Judy Forshaw (1992–1992)
Ben Foster (1999)
David Richard Fox (1995–1996, 2007)
Gilly Fraser (1985–1990)
Spenser Frearson (2006–2010, 2014, 2016)
Josh Freedman Berthoud (2014–2016)
Jane Galletly (1998–1989)
Frances Galleymore (1985)
Lucy Gannon (2011–2012)
Philip Gawthorne (2009)
Valerie Georgeson (1985)
Lisa Gifford (2017–2018)
Julia Gilbert (2006–2010)
Rob Gittins (1986, 1988–1991, 1996–)
Robert Goldsbrough (2014–2015)
Emma Goodwin (2005–2006)
Marcus Goodwin (2004)
Aileen Goss (2005)
Duncan Gould (1992–1993)
Matthew Graham (1992–1995, 2000–2002)
Tony Graham (2002)
Wendy Granditer (2005–2020)
Jess Green (2021–)
Tony Grounds (1990)
Tahsin Guner (2011)
Tanika Gupta (1999–2000)
Amy Guyler (2020–)
Sasha Hails (2006)
Jahvel Hall (2022)
Stephen Hallett (2008)
Peter J. Hammond (1990)
Billy Hamon (1985–1987, 1996)
Orla Hannon (2022)
Rebekah Harrison (2021–)
Matt Hartley (2021)
Kay Hartnett (2010)
Jim Hawkins (1985)
Sarah-Louise Hawkins (2002)
Catherine Hayes (1995)
Kate Henry (2005)
John Hickman (2018)
Nicholas Hicks-Beach (1995–2001, 2003–2012)
Tom Higgins (2012–2013)
Lindsey Hill (1999)
Mark Hiser (2003–2010)
Ming Ho (2001–2004)
Andrew Holden (1991, 1996)
Tony Holland (1985–1989)
Jane Hollowood (1985–1989)
Matthew Holt (1990)
Patrick Homes (2011–2015, 2018–2019)
Julia Honour (a pseudonym; 1998, 2000–2003, 2005–2008, 2010–2011, 2013–2018)
Kevin Hood (1995)
Sarah Hooper (2016–2017)
David Hopkins (1986–1987)
Gary Hopkins (1989)
Eirene Houston (2008–2009)
Charlie Humphreys (1985–1992)
Matthew Hurt (2018–2022)
Gerry Huxham (1985–1991, 1996)
Mark Illis (1998)
Paul Jenkins (2007)
Michael Jenner (2005–2008)
Mark Johnson (2003–2004)
Cat Jones (2015–2016)
Davey Jones (2015–2019)
Kelly Jones (2013–2014)
Tony Jordan (1989–2006, 2008, 2018)
Lisselle Kayla (1994–2002)
Michael Keane (2022–)
Emer Kenny (2012–2014)
Ian Kershaw (2007, 2017)
Stephen Keyworth (2007–2008, 2010)
Yasmeen Khan (2019–)
Bryan Kirkwood (2022–)
Lauren Klee (2009–)
Liz Lake (2014–2017)
Kit Lambert (2014–2015)
Natasha Langridge (2011)
Fred Lawless (1999)
David Lawrence (2011)
Philip Lawrence (2019–2020)
Zeddy Lawrence (1996)
Karen Laws (2008–2010)
Pete Lawson (2008–)
Richard Lazarus (2007–2015)
Jessica Lea (2015–2017)
Jenny Lecoat (1998–2002, 2004–2005)
Kolton Lee (1992–1993)
Wendy Lee (2000)
Michael Levine (2009)
Jack Lewis (1986)
John Lewis (1988–1989)
Geoff Lindsey (2006)
Daran Little (2010–)
David Lloyd (2003–2006)
Steph Lloyd Jones (2007, 2013–2014)
Paul Logue (2012)
Anji Loman Field (1999–2003)
Amber Lone (2021)
Doug Lucie (2006)
Bill Lyons (1985–1989)
Joanne Maguire (1993–2000, 2002, 2004–2006)
Lydia Marchant (2021–)
Paul Mari (2009–2014)
Jane Marlow (2010–2011)
Sharon Marshall (2011–2015)
Rosemary Mason (1985–1990)
Peter Mattessi (2011–2012, 2014–)
John Maynard (1986–1990)
Stephen McAteer (1995, 2003)
Barry McCarthy (1995–1997, 1999, 2001–2007)
Pippa McCarthy (2003–2007)
Glen McCoy (1985–1986, 1999–2000)
Conway McDermott (2021–)
Alan McDonald (1995)
Tony McHale (1985–1999)
Clare McIntyre (1998)
James McIntyre (2005)
Peter McKenna (2011–2012, 2018)
David McManus (2016)
Lisa McMullin (2019–2020)
Jane McNulty (2003–2005)
Pete McTighe (2011–2013)
Andrew Mettam (2014–2015)
Helen Millar (1991–1992)
Claire Miller (2021–)
Danny Miller (2001)
Hugh Miller (1985)
Shelley Miller (1995)
John Milne (1990–1991)
Natalie Mitchell (2013–2017, 2019–)
Dominique Moloney (2007–2009)
Ann Monks (2004)
Grazyna Monvid (1991)
David Moor (2022–)
Celia Morgan (2021)
Stuart Morris (1996)
Simon Moss (2003)
Robin Mukherjee (1990, 2001–2005)
Christine Murphy (2002)
Angela Murray (2018)
Chris Murray (1999–2000, 2007)
Jonathan Myerson (1993)
Tom Needham (2011–2012)
Rachael New (2015)
Lorraine Newman (2018–)
Alun Nipper (2004–2005)
D.A. Nixon (2022–)
Carol Noble (1997–1998)
Simon Norman (2018–2019)
Emma Norry (2022–)
John Oakden (1986)
Chris O'Connell (2005)
Tom Ogden (2004)
Jo O'Keefe (1997–2000, 2002–2004)
Sam Olver (2004)
Jesse O'Mahoney (2010–2018)
Debbie O'Malley (2004–2005)
Tim O'Mara (2000)
Jonny O'Neill (2014–)
Sian Orrells (1994–1995)
Deborah Palmer (2022–)
Carol Parker (2018)
Chris Parker (2006–2010)
Jyoti Patel (1990–1992, 1994)
James Payne (2002–2009, 2014–2015)
Fiona Peek (2011, 2013)
Marc Peirson (1999–2000)
Christopher Penfold (1990–1991)
Julian Perkins (1998–2001, 2004)
Ashley Pharoah (1991–1994)
Sarah Phelps (2002–2007, 2015–2016)
Winsome Pinnock (1990)
Rachel Pole (1996–2000, 2004)
Laura Poliakoff (2013–2017)
Bo Poraj (2014–2015, 2018–2019)
Jeff Povey (1992–1995, 2000–)
Emma Prentice (1996)
Tim Price (2010–2011)
Marc Pye (2005, 2012–2014)
Paul Quiney (2012–2017)
Bradley Quirk (2006)
Lena Rae (2008, 2010, 2019)
Ayshe Raif (1987, 1989–1991)
Darren Rapier (2015–2016)
Shazia Rashid (2010)
Andrew Rattenbury (2016)
Christopher Reason (1994–1998, 2000–2003, 2005–2019)
Nick Reed (1999)
Anya Reiss (2014–2016, 2018)
Kim Revill (2010–2015, 2017–)
Leo Richardson (2014–2017)
Gillian Richmond (1987–1997, 1999–2006, 2008–2010, 2014–2017)
Jake Riddell (2005–2012, 2019)
Carl Rigg (1987)
Bob Ritchie (2003–2005)
Michael Robartes (1985–1989, 1992–1995)
Heather Robson (2011–2012)
Paul Rose (2003)
Kevin Rundle (2020–)
Christopher Russell (1985)
Michael Russell (1990–1991)
Lee Saczak (2021–)
Nick Saltrese (2001, 2019)
Julia Schofield (1986)
Martin Scott (2018)
Dan Sefton (2001–2002)
Jon Sen (2014–2015)
Atiha Sen Gupta (2020–2021)
Rashida Seriki (2021)
Craig Sheldon (2018)
Barrie Shore (1991–1996, 1998–2000)
Tony Simon (2000)
Jez Simons (1990–1992, 1993)
Margaret Simpson (1991)
Helen Slavin (1995–1996, 2004)
Laura Sleep (2022–)
Patrea Smallacombe (2007–2009)
Al Smith (2007, 2009)
Christopher Smith (2003)
Kathrine Smith (2006, 2016–2017)
Maya Sondhi (2016)
Si Spencer (2000–2005)
Sumerah Srivastav (2016–2019)
Danny Stack (2009)
James Stevenson (1995)
Mark Stevenson (2013–2020, 2022)
Tim Stimpson (2017)
Richard Stockwell (2000–2002)
Alex Straker (2016–2017)
Stephen Stratford (1996)
Trevor Suthers (1999)
Kirstie Swain (2012)
Allan Swift (1985–1986, 1989)
Andrew Taft (1999–2005, 2009–2010)
Ben Tagoe (2012)
Sally Tatchell (2013–2014)
Gert Thomas (2006–2009)
Mark Thomas (1988)
Paul Matthew Thompson (2012–2013)
Sydney Thompson (2018–2019)
Joanna Toye (2017)
Stephen Tredre (1997)
Catherine Tregenna (2003)
Angela Turvey (1995)
Gary Tyler (2003)
Ben Vanstone (2005–2007)
Simon Vinnicombe (2010)
Paul Walker (2018–2019)
Nick Warburton (2002–2004)
Thea Ward (2018, 2020)
Julie Wassmer (1995–2008)
Katerina Watson (2021–2022)
Laura Watson (2005–2009)
Poz Watson (2021–)
Alison Watt (1999–2000, 2005)
Katharine Way (2001–2002)
Steve Waye (1990–1991)
Chris Webb (2000–2002)
Paula Webb (1996, 1999–2002)
Mark Wheatley (1987–1989)
Patrick Wilde (2007)
Susan Wilkins (2006)
Lindsay Williams (2012–2015)
Rob Williams (2010, 2012)
Nicola Wilson (2011–2012)
Rebecca Wojciechowski (2009–2014, 2019–2020)
Annie Wood (1994–2004, 2006–2010)
Pete Jordi Wood (2014)
Sophie Woolley (2021)
Kate Wright (1999–2000)
Colin Wyatt (2002–2010, 2012–2020)
Michael Wynne (2008–2009)
Arnold Yarrow (1992–1994)
Jeff Young (2007–2008)
Justin Young (2008)
Richard Zajdlic (1994–1995, 2006–2010)

References

External links
 EastEnders crew  at bbc.co.uk
 EastEnders full cast and crew at the Internet Movie Database

Crew
Lists of television people
BBC people